Waterlily Jaguar is a 2018 drama film written and directed by Melora Walters. The film stars James LeGros, Mira Sorvino, Stacey Oristano, Dominic Monaghan, Christopher Backus and Steven Swadling. The film centers on Bob (LeGros), a famous novelist known for his "airport novels" seeking to pen a more serious book, only to find himself tumbling down a spiral of obsession that may leave his most important relationships in shambles, including his marriage.

Cast 
 James LeGros as Bob
 Mira Sorvino as Helen, his wife
 Stacey Oristano as Wilhelmina, his assistant
 Dominic Monaghan as Bill, his agent
 Christopher Backus as Jackson
 Steven Swadling as Peter
 Lili Mirojnick as Scarlet

Production 
Filming started in Los Angeles in January 2017 and lasted several weeks.

References

External links 
 

2018 films
American drama films
2018 drama films
Films directed by Melora Walters
2010s English-language films
2010s American films